Basin Fork is a stream in Johnson and Pettis counties in the U.S. state of Missouri. It is a tributary of Flat Creek.

Basin Fork was so named because its course is said to be shaped like a basin.

See also
List of rivers of Missouri

References

Rivers of Johnson County, Missouri
Rivers of Pettis County, Missouri
Rivers of Missouri